Asiab Sar (also Romanized as Āsīāb Sar) is a village in Kuhestan Rural District, in the Central District of Behshahr County, Mazandaran Province, Iran. At the 2006 census, its population was 1,598, in 427 families.

References 

Populated places in Behshahr County